The Complete 2012 Performances Collection is an extended play (EP) by American blues rock musician John Mayer. Released on August 7, 2012 as an iTunes-exclusive digital download, the EP contains four acoustic versions of tracks from Mayer's latest album Born and Raised, as well as a previously unreleased track from the album's recording sessions.

Track listing

References

2012 EPs
John Mayer EPs